Souls at Zero is the debut studio album by American heavy metal band Souls at Zero (formerly Wrathchild America), released on July 20, 1993 by Energy Rekords. While retaining the thrash metal roots of Wrathchild America, the sound of this album is also of groove metal and alternative metal akin to Pantera and Helmet.

Track listing

Personnel
 Brad Divens – lead vocals, bass
 Jay Abbene – guitars
 Terry Carter – guitars
 Shannon Larkin – drums

Production
 Drew Mazurek – engineer

References

1993 debut albums
Souls at Zero (band) albums